Kenneth Fok Kai-kong, JP (born 2 July 1979) is a Hong Kong businessman and politician. The eldest grandson of tycoon Henry Fok and eldest son of Timothy Fok, he is Legislative Councillor for the Sports, Performing Arts, Culture and Publication Functional Constituency. He is the vice president of the Fok Ying Tung Group, vice president of the Sports Federation & Olympic Committee of Hong Kong, China and a member of the National Committee of the Chinese People’s Political Consultative Conference (CPPCC).

Biography
Fok was born into the prominent pro-Beijing business family. His grandfather, Henry Fok, was a Hong Kong real estate developer, president of the Real Estate Developers Association of Hong Kong and Hong Kong Football Association, and was one of the first Hong Kong entrepreneurs to invest in mainland China, in 1980s. He rose to become the vice chairman of the National Committee of the Chinese People's Political Consultative Conference (CPPCC). His father, Timothy Fok, is also president of the Hong Kong Football Association and the Sports Federation & Olympic Committee of Hong Kong, China, a member of the CPPCC National Committee and former member of the Legislative Council for the Sports, Performing Arts, Culture and Publication functional constituency. His mother, Loletta Chu, was the winner of the 1977 Miss Hong Kong Pageant.

Fok graduated from Oxford University with a bachelor's degree in Economics and Management before returning to Hong Kong to join his family business and subsequently become vice president of the Fok Ying Tung Group. With his family's political background and influence in the sports development, he was appointed to serve on various government advisory and statutory bodies, including the chair of the Committee of Youth Activities in Hong Kong, member of the Youth Development Commission, Commission on Poverty, and Betting and Lotteries Commission; executive vice chair of Greater Bay Area Homeland Youth Community Foundation, standing committee member of Youth Committee of the Chinese General Chamber of Commerce, standing committee member of the All-China Youth Federation, and vice chairman of Tianjin Youth Federation and trustee of the China Oxford Scholarship Fund. 
Other public offices he holds include member of the Hong Kong Arts Development Council, adviser to the Association of Chinese Culture of Hong Kong, adviser to the Hong Kong Culture and Art Promotion Association and the chairman of Culture Action.

He is also vice chairman of Elite Sports Committee and ex-officio member of Sports Commission of the Home Affairs Bureau, vice president of the Sports Federation & Olympic Committee of Hong Kong, China, president of the Gymnastics Association of Hong Kong, China, director of Hong Kong Sports Institute, a committee member of the International Relations Committee of the Olympic Council of Asia, president of the Asian Electronic Sports Federation, and member of the International Experts Committee For Global Active City Asian Standard. His appointment as vice president of the Sports Federation & Olympic Committee of Hong Kong, China, where his father Timothy Fok is a long-time president, was scrutinised by the media, which claimed that Timothy Fok appointed his son without transparency, and that Kenneth Fok had no track record in any type of sporting achievement.

Fok was appointed member of the Tianjin Municipal Committee Member of the Chinese People’s Political Consultative Conference. He was also appointed as a part-time member of the Central Policy Unit during the Donald Tsang administration from 2008 to 2009. He was also appointed member of the National Committee of the Chinese People’s Political Consultative Conference, following the paths of his grandfather and father. In 2016, he was appointed Justice of the Peace by the Hong Kong government.

Controversies 

In December 2021, it was reported that Fok had a "privileged" vote in the 2021 Hong Kong legislative election, where the vote would count approximately 7,215 times more than an ordinary citizen. He was elected as a member of the Legislative Council following his win in the Sports, Performing Arts, Culture and Publication constituency.

On 5 January 2022, Carrie Lam announced new warnings and restrictions against social gathering ascribed to the3 potential for COVID-19 outbreaks. One day later, it was discovered that Fok had attended a birthday party hosted by Witman Hung Wai-man,  with 222 guests. At least one guest tested positive for COVID-19, causing all guests to be quarantined. Fok later refused to discuss how he could be held accountable for attending the party after the government had warned against gathering in large groups.

Personal life
Fok met China's "princess of diving", multiple Olympic gold medallist Guo Jingjing in 2004. The couple married on 8 November 2012 and have a son and two young daughters. In 2019, his father Timothy gifted a HK$160 million house in Repulse Bay to Kenneth and his family.

References

1979 births
Living people
Alumni of Pembroke College, Oxford
Delegates to the 14th National People's Congress from Hong Kong
HK LegCo Members 2022–2025
Hong Kong businesspeople
Hong Kong justices of the peace
Members of the Election Committee of Hong Kong, 2017–2021
Members of the Election Committee of Hong Kong, 2021–2026
Members of the National Committee of the Chinese People's Political Consultative Conference
People from Panyu District
Reality show winners
The Amazing Race contestants